Aushi, known by native speakers as Ikyaushi, is a Bantu language primarily spoken in the Lwapula Province of Zambia and the (Haut-)Katanga Province of the Democratic Republic of Congo. Although many scholars argue that it is a dialect of the closely related Bemba, native speakers insist that it is a distinct language. Nonetheless, speakers of both linguistic varieties enjoy extensive mutual intelligibility, particularly in the Lwapula Province.

Phonology 

Aushi distinguishes consonants according to five manners and four places of articulation. Although nasal consonants are individually phonemic, prenasalized consonants also arise in conjunction with the voiced and voiceless counterparts of the plosives, affricates, and fricatives.

Aushi has five canonical vowels that are distinguished segmentally according to vowel height and backness and suprasegmentally according to length (short/long) and tone (low/high). The front and central vowels are unrounded, while the back vowels are rounded. In environments where vowels arise before a nasal consonant, the vowels may adopt nasality, but this is not a distinctive feature, i.e. it is phonetic, not phonemic.

Grammar

References

Further reading

 Bickmore, Lee. 2018. "Contrast Reemergence in the Aushi Subjunctive." Africana Linguistica, 24: 123-138.
 Doke, Clement Martyn. 1933. "A Short Aushi Vocabulary." Bantu Studies 7(1): 284-295.
 Ilunga, Nkimba Kafituka. 1994. Les Formes Verbales de l’Ikyaushi, M42b. Unpublished MA thesis. Institute Supérieur Pédagogique de Lubumbashi, Democratic Republic of Congo.
 Kankomba and Twilingiyimana. 1986. "M421 Aushi." Tervuren, Belgium: Annales, Sciences Humaines, Royal Museum for Central Africa.
 Spier, Troy E. 2016. "A Survey of the IcAushi Language and Nominal Class System." Proceedings of the 43rd Annual Conference of the Linguistic Association of Canada and the United States (LACUS).
 ———. 2020. A Descriptive Grammar of Ikyaushi. Ph.D. dissertation, Tulane University, USA.
 ———. 2021. "Four Trickster Tales in Ikyaushi." World Literature Today, Autumn: 68-71.
 ———. 2022. "Nominal Phrase Structure in Ikyaushi (M.402)." Studies in African Languages and Cultures.

Sabi languages
Languages of Zambia
Languages of the Democratic Republic of the Congo